Thangam Thennarasu (born 3 June 1966) is an Indian politician and the Minister for Department of Industries, Tamil Official Language, Tamil Culture and Archeology Minister of Tamil nadu. He served as Minister for School Education in Tamil Nadu during 2006-2011. He was born in Mallankinaru, Tamil Nadu. He has a bachelor's degree in Engineering. He has been elected to the Tamil Nadu assembly five times. He is the son of the former Member of Legislative Assembly from Aruppukottai, V. Thangapandian

He was elected to the Tamil Nadu legislative assembly as a Dravida Munnetra Kazhagam candidate from Aruppukottai constituency in 1997/98 by-election, and 2006 election. He is the younger brother of recently elected Member of Parliament, Lok Sabha, from the Chennai South constituency, Thamizhachi Thangapandian.

Ministerial roles 
Thennarasu, whose father was V. Thangapandian, a Dravida Munnetra Kazhagam (DMK) government minister, himself because Minister for Schools in the DMK government that gained power at the 2006 state assembly elections.

Later career 
Thennarasu stood as a candidate in the newly-created constituency of Tiruchuli for the 2011 elections.

He filed a case in the court against the Tamil Nadu Government's decision to form an inquiry into the alleged irregularities in construction of Tamil Nadu legislative assembly-secretariat complex

Elections contested and results

See also
Anna Centenary Library
Iniyavai Naarppathu Parade
Abonded assembly complex

References

External links 
First Mega Job Fair
Job Fair in Thiruchirapalli
Job Fair Continued

Dravida Munnetra Kazhagam politicians
1966 births
Living people
Tamil Nadu ministers
Tamil Nadu MLAs 2006–2011
Tamil Nadu MLAs 2011–2016
Tamil Nadu MLAs 2016–2021
Tamil Nadu MLAs 2021–2026
Tamil Nadu politicians